CHFO was a French language Canadian radio station located at 1350 kHz (AM) in Gatineau, Quebec. The station had a community radio format.

History
On November 29, 2017, the Canadian Radio-television and Telecommunications Commission (CRTC) approved an application by Radio Communautaire Francophone et Francophile de l’Outaouais to operate a new French-language community radio station in Gatineau, Quebec. The new station would operate on the AM band at 1350 kHz with a daytime transmitter power of 1,000 watts and a nighttime transmitter power of 180 watts. 

In February 2018, the station began on-air testing at 1350 kHz and officially signed on in the spring. In 2019, the station left the air permanently.

Notes
AM 1350 in Gatineau was previously used by CIRA-5, a rebroadcaster of CIRA-FM in Montreal from 2012 until it left the air in 2015.

References

External links
History of CHFO - Canadian Communications Foundation

Hfo
Radio stations established in 2017
Radio stations disestablished in 2019
Hfo
2017 establishments in Quebec
2019 disestablishments in Quebec